"Start Again" is a song by American pop rock group OneRepublic, featuring American rapper Logic. The song was released on May 15, 2018, as a single from the Season 2 soundtrack of TV series 13 Reasons Why. The track was released through record labels Mosley Music Group and Interscope Records. The song was written by OneRepublic frontman Ryan Tedder, Logic, Anita Blay, Danny Majic, Jez Ashurst, DJ Frank E, and Alex Stacey. Production was handled by Tedder, Majic, and Frank E. 
The video for the track was released on June 22, 2018, through OneRepublic's YouTube account.

Music video
The music video was released on June 22, 2018.

Track listing

Charts
Original version

Duet Version

Certifications

Release history

References

External links
 
 

2018 songs
2018 singles
OneRepublic songs
Logic (rapper) songs
Mosley Music Group singles
Interscope Records singles
Songs from television series
Songs written by Ryan Tedder
Songs written by Jez Ashurst
Songs written by DJ Frank E
Song recordings produced by Ryan Tedder
Song recordings produced by DJ Frank E
Songs written by Anita Blay
Songs written by Logic (rapper)